First-seeded Nancye Bolton defeated Joyce Fitch 6–4, 6–4 in the final to win the women's singles tennis title at the 1946 Australian Championships.

Seeds
The seeded players are listed below. Nancye Bolton is the champion; others show the round in which they were eliminated.

 Nancye Bolton (champion)
 Nell Hopman (quarterfinals)
 Thelma Long (quarterfinals)
 Joan Hartigan (quarterfinals)
 Constance Wilson (semifinals)
 Alison Hattersley (second round)
 Dulcie Whittaker (quarterfinals)
 Joyce Fitch (finalist)

Draw

Key
 Q = Qualifier
 WC = Wild card
 LL = Lucky loser
 r = Retired

Finals

Earlier rounds

Section 1

Section 2

External links
 

1946 in women's tennis
1946
1946 in Australian women's sport
Women's Singles